Luís Parruque (born 28 July 1969) is a Mozambican former footballer who played as a defender. He made 28 appearances for the Mozambique national team from 1993 to 1997. He was also named in Mozambique's squad for the 1996 African Cup of Nations tournament.

References

1969 births
Living people
Sportspeople from Maputo
Mozambican footballers
Association football defenders
Mozambique international footballers
1996 African Cup of Nations players
CD Matchedje de Maputo players
GD Maputo players
Clube Ferroviário de Maputo footballers